Marcel Bleustein-Blanchet (21 August 1906 – 11 April 1996) was a French entrepreneur and advertising magnate best known as the founder of Publicis Groupe.

He is also credited with inventing radio advertising in France, helped create the first French opinion polls, introduced Édith Piaf to the French public, and fought with the Free French forces during World War II.

Early life
Born the youngest of nine, he was the son of Abraham Bleustein, a poor Russian-Jewish used furniture salesman in northern Paris, Marcel Bleustein left school at the age of 12 to help out in the family furniture business.

He founded Publicis in 1926 in a small apartment above a butcher's shop. In 1935, he purchased Radio LL from the radio manufacturer Lucien Lévy. He renamed it Radio Cité, and introduced France's first news broadcasts as well as its first radio jingles. Radio Cité also helped launch singer Édith Piaf.

Life around World War II
In 1939, Marcel Bleustein married Sophie Vaillant, an English teacher who was the granddaughter of Édouard Vaillant, a well-known 19th century Socialist politician. They had three daughters, including Elisabeth Badinter, a prominent feminist writer and philosopher who chairs the supervisory board of Publicis Groupe.

When the Second World War broke out, Marcel Bleustein's companies were confiscated by the German occupation forces as "Jewish properties". He joined the Resistance, took the code-name "Blanchet", and was detached to serve as a co-pilot for the US Eighth Air Force, flying bombing missions over France and the Netherlands.

Rebuilding Publicis
When the war ended, he rebuilt Publicis from scratch, introducing the first opinion polls in France and developing the then-American fields of consumer research and brand analysis. He retained his Resistance name of Blanchet, adding it legally to his original name.

After the war, Mr. Bleustein-Blanchet reopened Publicis and, calling them on the phone himself, rapidly regained old and new clients, notably Shell, Colgate-Palmolive, L'Oreal, Renault, Dim and many others.

In 1957 he opened the first "Publicis Drugstore" on the ground level of Publicis' headquarters, 133 avenue des Champs Elysées, former location of the Astoria hotel. The "Drugstore" was a huge success and immediately became the rendez vous point of the cool parisian youth. 

During the 1970s, under the leadership of Marcel Bleustein-Blanchet and his successor, Maurice Lévy, Publicis became an international communications group and is now the third largest communications group in the world.

In 2008, twelve years after his death, the American Advertising Federation announced that Marcel Bleustein-Blanchet would become the first non-American to be named to the Advertising Hall of Fame.

Other interests
He is a founding member of L’Académie nationale des arts de la rue (ANAR) created in 1975 with Jacques Dauphin, Maurice Cazeneuve, Paul Delouvrier, Georges Elgozy, Roger Excoffon, Abraham Moles, and André Parinaud.

See also 
Fondation Marcel Bleustein-Blanchet

References

Further reading

 Hultquist, Clark. "Publicis and the French advertising world, 1946—1968" Essays in Economic & Business History (2009) 27: 61–76
 Lorin, Philippe. 5 Giants of Advertising (Assouline Pub., 2001). pp 82–95

Primary sources
 Memoirs
 Bleustein-Blanchet, Marcel, and Pierre Descaves. Sur mon antenne (Éditions Défense de la France, 1948)
Bleustein-Blanchet, Marcel. La rage de convaincre (Éditions Roberf Laffont, 1970)
Bleustein-Blanchet, Marcel. Les ondes de la liberté: sur mon antenne, 1934–1984 (JC Lattès, 1984)

1906 births
1996 deaths
People from Enghien-les-Bains
20th-century French businesspeople
French advertising executives
20th-century French Jews
French people of Russian-Jewish descent